John Frank Wilson (December 11, 1941 – October 4, 1991) was an American singer, the lead vocalist of J. Frank Wilson and the Cavaliers. Born in Lufkin, Texas, Wilson was inducted into the West Texas Music Hall Of Fame.

Career
Wilson joined the Cavaliers after his discharge from Goodfellow Air Force Base in San Angelo, Texas, in 1962.

The Cavaliers' first chart hit was "Last Kiss", a song written by Wayne Cochran, who had based the song on a car accident in Barnesville, Georgia, near where he lived.

The song, while only garnering minor success for Wayne Cochran and the C.C. Riders, found major success for the Cavaliers. "Last Kiss" became a hit in June 1964, it reached the top 10 in October of that year, eventually reaching number two on the Billboard Hot 100. It sold over one million copies, and was awarded a gold disc.

In October 1964, the British music magazine NME reported that Wilson had himself been involved in an auto accident near Lima, Ohio, in which his 27-year-old record producer, Sonley Roush, was killed, and Wilson was seriously injured.

While J. Frank Wilson and the Cavaliers recorded many more songs, and "Last Kiss" was subsequently covered successfully by Wednesday and Pearl Jam, the band charted with only one other song, "Hey, Little One", which reached number 85.

Wilson, with or without the Cavaliers, continued to release records until 1978. He started working offshore oilfield in late 1970s and 1980s in the Gulf of Mexico.

Wilson died on October 4, 1991, at the age of 49, from alcoholism and complications from diabetes.

References

External links
Yahoo bio

1941 births
1991 deaths
Alcohol-related deaths in Texas
American rhythm and blues singers
Charay Records artists
Jamie Records artists
People from Lufkin, Texas
Singers from Texas
20th-century American singers
20th-century American male singers